Große Wilde is a river of Saxony-Anhalt, Germany. At its confluence with the Lude in Stolberg (Harz), the Thyra is formed.

See also
List of rivers of Saxony-Anhalt

Rivers of Saxony-Anhalt
Rivers of Germany